Toirdhealbhach Óg Donn Ó Conchobair (Turlough O'Connor) (died 9 December 1406) was a King of Connacht, a kingdom  which lies west of the River Shannon in Ireland. He was the son of Aedh mac Tairdelbach Ó Conchobair. Few single members of the Ó Conchobair dynasty were able to assume overall control of the three main clan septs after the 1380s. Toirdhealbhach was one of the last kings of Connacht, who were by his time reduced to their ancestral lands in County Roscommon.

References

 Byrne, Francis John (2001), Irish Kings and High-Kings, Dublin: Four Courts Press, 
 Gaelic and Gaelised Ireland, Kenneth Nicols, 1972.

1406 deaths
People from County Roscommon
15th-century Irish monarchs
O'Conor dynasty
Year of birth unknown